Peak Road is a road in The Peak on Hong Kong Island, Hong Kong. It is the only road to travel from Victoria Gap to Wan Chai Gap on Hong Kong Island. The Peak Road is a two-lane two-way traffic, which can take buses, minibuses and other vehicles. The highest altitude is about 420 meters.

Location
The Peak Road starts west of The Peak Tower and The Peak Galleria, and east of The Peak Lookout, namely the junction of Harlech Road, Mount Austin Road, Lugard Road, Old Peak Road and Findlay Road, passing Plunkett's Road, Mount Kellett Road, Peel Rise, Peak Police Station, Craigmin Road, Barker Road and Magazine Gap Road, ending in the Hong Kong Police Museum in Wan Chai Gap, namely Wan Chai Gap Road, Stubbs Road, Black's Link, Middle Gap Road, Mount Cameron Road, Aberdeen Reservoir Road and Coombe Road.

History
The former Peak Road originally referred to the current Old Peak Road, and the current Peak Road belonged to Stubbs Road at that time and was opened to traffic in 1923. On 1 September 1960, the Peak Road, which originally connected Central and the Peak, was renamed the Old Peak Road, while the section of Stubbs Road, which connected Wan Chai Gap and the Peak, was renamed Peak Road.

Landslides
On 17 June 1983, a landslide occurred on the Peak Road under torrential rain, and collapsed a section of the road several dozen meters long. A taxi passing by the area rolled down the hillside. Fortunately, neither the driver nor the two passengers were injured. . The Peak Road was closed for a week afterwards.

On 5 November 2021, at the junction of Peak Road and Coombe Road, due to the burst of the fresh water pipe, a large amount of fresh water gushed out, causing a landslide on a slope of 30 meters by 100 meters. No one was injured. The measures, heavy vehicles can not travel, and buses were changed to single-deck, and maintained until 19 November. Fortunately, reinforcement works have been carried out at this location, so a lot of sand and mud rushed down the mountain when the incident occurred, and the road was still sound, and no casualties were caused.

See also
 List of streets and roads in Hong Kong

References

External links

Mid-Levels
Roads on Hong Kong Island